The following is a list of the MTV Europe Music Award winners and nominees for Best Polish Act.

Winners and nominees
Winners are listed first and highlighted in bold.

1990s

2000s

2010s

2020s

Local Hero Award — Poland

References

MTV Europe Music Awards
Polish music
Awards established in 2000